A statue of Robert Baden-Powell, founder of Scouting, is installed on the Quay in Poole harbour, Dorset on the south coast of England. The statue, erected in 2008, is a life-size bronze of Robert Baden-Powell by sculptor David Annand. It portrays Baden-Powell in his scout uniform, seated on a log as if for a campfire, with a pair of log seats either side which "allow easy access for photo opportunities".

History
The memorial was unveiled on 13 August 2008, facing Brownsea Island. The island was the site of Baden-Powell's first camp in 1907 which is seen as the start of the Scout and Guide movement.

Robert Baden-Powell has been criticised over alleged events during his army career and his comments of support concerning Adolf Hitler and 
his autobiography, Mein Kampf. His biographer, Tim Jeal, said that any admiration was limited to his and Hitler's shared ideas for boys' education and liking Mein Kampfs references to character training. In June 2020, the memorial appeared on a list of targets by protesters during the George Floyd protests in Britain. Bournemouth, Christchurch and Poole Council planned to move it into storage pending discussion about its future, but council workers failed to remove the statue on 11 June 2020 as planned because the foundations were deeper than they had realised. A group of local people then surrounded the statue to prevent its removal and protect it from both council workers and activists. The council announced that it would arrange 24 hour security for the statue until either the statue had been removed or the threat had passed. On 12 June the statue was boarded up by the council for its protection.

In response to the controversy, Bear Grylls, current  Chief Scout, and successor to Baden-Powell, said, "As Scouts, we most certainly do not celebrate Baden-Powell for his failings. We see them and we acknowledge them. ... But we also recognise that Baden-Powell is part of our history, and history is nothing if we do not learn from it. ... it's right that we take time to listen, to educate ourselves, and reflect on our movement’s history. We need the humility to recognise there are times when the views and actions from our Scouting’s past do not always match the values we live by today. We must learn, adapt, and improve. ... Baden-Powell may have taken the first step in creating Scouting, but the journey continues today without him. We know where we came from but we are not going back." Grylls also said that he hoped Scouting statues  remain in place "to remind us all of one thing - the huge positive influence that Scouting continues to bring to so many young people worldwide."

See also

Actions against memorials in the United Kingdom during the George Floyd protests

References

External links

 

2008 establishments in the United Kingdom
2008 sculptures
Bronze sculptures in the United Kingdom
Buildings and structures in Poole
George Floyd protests in the United Kingdom
Monuments and memorials in the United Kingdom
Outdoor sculptures in the United Kingdom
Scouting and Guiding in the United Kingdom
Scouting in art
Sculptures of men in the United Kingdom
Statues in England
Scouting monuments and memorials